Watson Elementary School can refer to the following schools:

Watson Elementary School (Arkansas), in Little Rock
Watson Elementary School (British Columbia), in Chilliwack